Helgafell ("holy mountain") is an inactive 227-metre-high volcanic cone located on the island of Heimaey in the Vestmannaeyjar archipelago in Iceland. 

The Stórhöfði peninsula immediately to the south of Helgafell in what is now southern Heimaey formed about 6000 years ago, with Helgafell forming from a secondary eruption a thousand years later. Immediately north of Helgafell is the active volcano Eldfell, which last erupted January 23, 1973.

Helgafell is a dormant cone volcano, although it is considered likely that it will erupt again in the future.

References 

Volcanoes of Iceland
Mountains of Iceland
Dormant volcanoes
Vestmannaeyjar